The Polish Orienteering Association (PZOS) is the Polish national organisation of orienteering. It is a full Member of the International Orienteering Federation.

History
The Polish Orienteering Federation was founded in 1960, and joined the International Orienteering Federation in 1967. Poland participated in the World Orienteering Championships first time in 1970.

References

External links
Orienteering in Poland - Polish Orienteering Association

International Orienteering Federation members
Orienteering